Nelsonic Industries was an American electronics manufacturing and development company that operated from Long Island City, Queens, New York City in the early 1980s and throughout the 1990s when it was acquired by the watch-manufacturer, M.Z. Berger. Nelsonic produced numerous toy-themed wristwatches, often targeting younger audiences with likenesses of characters from popular franchises such as Barbie, the Ghostbusters, and Mario. Nelsonic became notable during the early mid-1980s for being the first electronics company in the United States to produce game-watches (multi-purpose electronic devices capable of functioning as both a time-piece and as a typically electronic game). For a period subsequent to its purchase by M.Z. Berger, Nelsonic operated as a subsidiary division of its parent company and game-watches were produced that bore the Nelsonic mark. This practice ended as M.Z. Berger shifted focus to more traditional and higher-end timepieces. Today the original Nelsonic Game Watch line has entered the secondary market and individual Game Watches have become highly sought-after collectibles that often fetch high prices on eBay and other online auction websites.

History

Throughout its existence, Nelsonic produced pop-culture-themed wrist-watches for children and young adults. The chronograph digital watches, typically made of molded plastic, invariably featured an alarm and utilized LCD screens to display the time for their wearers. In time the company began manufacturing multi-purpose units that used the LCD screen to combine time display functions with simple video game functions. These simple video games were variations on the theme of the calculator watch, and the patent covering the Game Watch line is in fact classified as an "electronic calculator watch structure." The company's first game watch was called Space Attacker.  Becoming the first electronics manufacturer in the United States to produce game-watches, Nelsonic earned a large share in this specialized market and was able to earn the attention of large video game companies at events such as the Consumer Electronics Show. Having caught the popular attention and with goodwill at a high-point, Nelsonic was able to obtain licensing from several big-name video game companies such as Sega, Nintendo, Midway Games, and Mylstar Electronics. With roots in the toy market, Nelsonic was also able to obtain similar licenses to produce LCD versions of popular electronic toys like Milton Bradley's Simon as well as to produce original LCD games for non-game toy franchises like Barbie, G.I. Joe, and Power Rangers and even for film and TV franchises such as Ghostbusters. So well-known became the Nelsonic brand that it was even able to license its own original games (such as the Nelsonic version of the public-domain blackjack which was licensed to Caesars Palace).

As time progressed, Nelsonic experimented with higher-end products such as metal watches and increasingly complex game-watch designs. In 1990 the watch-making giant, M.Z. Berger, made a large bid and was able to successfully purchase the company. For a period of nearly a decade after this acquisition, M.Z. Berger continued to use Nelsonic as a subsidiary branch and to employ the Nelsonic mark in the release of game-watches and the production of new re-releases of popular models from the 1980s and early 1990s. By the end of the 1990s, however, public interest had waned (quite possibly due to the rise in popularity of more advanced handheld video game consoles and, eventually, of other portable computing devices, such as PDAs and smartphones) and this practice came to an end as M.Z. Berger shifted markets to target higher end consumers more exclusively.

Today the Nelsonic mark is still in use for traditional watches and is not used in connection with game-watches. It is still a subsidiary of M.Z. Berger and as recently as 2007 it was listed by the AAFES as garnering over $1.9 million in sales.

Game watches
Below is a list of units sold by Nelsonic as part of their Game Watch line. Also included are game-watches sold under the term "Wrist Game" (e.g. Ghost Busters), "Action Watch Game" (e.g. Barbie), and "Gamewatch Boy" (e.g. Super Mario Race).

See also
Game & Watch - A line of LCD games produced by Nintendo from 1980 to 1991. This series is often confused with the Nelsonic Game Watch series due to the similar names (Nelsonic's "Game Watch" compared to Nintendo's "Game & Watch") and the overlapping subject matter (due to Nintendo's having licensed several of its popular franchises to Nelsonic).
Elgin National Watch Company - Another former watch-company that is now owned by M.Z. Berger and is thus a sibling subsidiary to Nelsonic.
Waltham Watch Company - Another sibling subsidiary to Nelsonic.
Gruen Watch Co. - Another sibling subsidiary to Nelsonic.
Unisonic Products Corporation - Another manufacturer of game watches.

Notes

References

External links
M.Z. Berger & Co. - Parent company currently controlling the rights to the Nelsonic mark and all former Nelsonic properties.
Nelsonic Gallery at the Handheld Museum

Toy brands
Toy companies of the United States
Defunct video game companies of the United States
Defunct watchmaking companies
Defunct manufacturing companies based in New York City